ISO 3166-1 alpha-3 codes are three-letter country codes defined in ISO 3166-1, part of the ISO 3166 standard published by the International Organization for Standardization (ISO), to represent countries, dependent territories, and special areas of geographical interest. They allow a better visual association between the codes and the country names than the two-letter alpha-2 codes (the third set of codes is numeric and hence offers no visual association). They were first included as part of the ISO 3166 standard in its first edition in 1974.

Uses and applications
The ISO 3166-1 alpha-3 codes are used most prominently in ISO/IEC 7501-1 for machine-readable passports, as standardized by the International Civil Aviation Organization, with a number of additional codes for special passports; some of these codes are currently reserved and not used at the present stage in ISO 3166-1.

The United Nations uses a combination of ISO 3166-1 alpha-2 and alpha-3 codes, along with codes that pre-date the creation of ISO 3166, for international vehicle registration codes, which are codes used to identify the issuing country of a vehicle registration plate; some of these codes are currently indeterminately reserved in ISO 3166-1.

Current codes

Officially assigned code elements
The following is a complete list of the current officially assigned ISO 3166-1 alpha-3 codes, using a title case version of the English short names officially defined by the ISO 3166 Maintenance Agency (ISO 3166/MA):

   Aruba
   Afghanistan
   Angola
   Anguilla
   Åland Islands
   Albania
   Andorra
   United Arab Emirates
   Argentina
   Armenia
   American Samoa
   Antarctica
   French Southern Territories
   Antigua and Barbuda
   Australia
   Austria
   Azerbaijan
   Burundi
   Belgium
   Benin
   Bonaire, Sint Eustatius and Saba
   Burkina Faso
   Bangladesh
   Bulgaria
   Bahrain
   Bahamas
   Bosnia and Herzegovina
   Saint Barthélemy
   Belarus
   Belize
   Bermuda
   Bolivia (Plurinational State of)
   Brazil
   Barbados
   Brunei Darussalam
   Bhutan
   Bouvet Island
   Botswana
   Central African Republic
   Canada
   Cocos (Keeling) Islands
   Switzerland
   Chile
   China
   Côte d'Ivoire
   Cameroon
   Congo, Democratic Republic of the
   Congo
   Cook Islands
   Colombia
   Comoros
   Cabo Verde
   Costa Rica
   Cuba
   Curaçao
   Christmas Island
   Cayman Islands
   Cyprus
   Czechia
   Germany
   Djibouti
   Dominica
   Denmark
   Dominican Republic
   Algeria
   Ecuador
   Egypt
   Eritrea
   Western Sahara
   Spain
   Estonia
   Ethiopia
   Finland
   Fiji
   Falkland Islands (Malvinas)
   France
   Faroe Islands
   Micronesia (Federated States of)
   Gabon
   United Kingdom of Great Britain and Northern Ireland
   Georgia
   Guernsey
   Ghana
   Gibraltar
   Guinea
   Guadeloupe
   Gambia
   Guinea-Bissau
   Equatorial Guinea
   Greece
   Grenada
   Greenland
   Guatemala
   French Guiana
   Guam
   Guyana
   Hong Kong
   Heard Island and McDonald Islands
   Honduras
   Croatia
   Haiti
   Hungary
   Indonesia
   Isle of Man
   India
   British Indian Ocean Territory
   Ireland
   Iran (Islamic Republic of)
   Iraq
   Iceland
   Israel
   Italy
   Jamaica
   Jersey
   Jordan
   Japan
   Kazakhstan
   Kenya
   Kyrgyzstan
   Cambodia
   Kiribati
   Saint Kitts and Nevis
   Korea, Republic of
   Kuwait
   Lao People's Democratic Republic
   Lebanon
   Liberia
   Libya
   Saint Lucia
   Liechtenstein
   Sri Lanka
   Lesotho
   Lithuania
   Luxembourg
   Latvia
   Macao
   Saint Martin (French part)
   Morocco
   Monaco
   Moldova, Republic of
   Madagascar
   Maldives
   Mexico
   Marshall Islands
   North Macedonia
   Mali
   Malta
   Myanmar
   Montenegro
   Mongolia
   Northern Mariana Islands
   Mozambique
   Mauritania
   Montserrat
   Martinique
   Mauritius
   Malawi
   Malaysia
   Mayotte
   Namibia
   New Caledonia
   Niger
   Norfolk Island
   Nigeria
   Nicaragua
   Niue
   Netherlands
   Norway
   Nepal
   Nauru
   New Zealand
   Oman
   Pakistan
   Panama
   Pitcairn
   Peru
   Philippines
   Palau
   Papua New Guinea
   Poland
   Puerto Rico
   Korea (Democratic People's Republic of)
   Portugal
   Paraguay
   Palestine, State of
   French Polynesia
   Qatar
   Réunion
   Romania
   Russian Federation
   Rwanda
   Saudi Arabia
   Sudan
   Senegal
   Singapore
   South Georgia and the South Sandwich Islands
   Saint Helena, Ascension and Tristan da Cunha
   Svalbard and Jan Mayen
   Solomon Islands
   Sierra Leone
   El Salvador
   San Marino
   Somalia
   Saint Pierre and Miquelon
   Serbia
   South Sudan
   
   Suriname
   Slovakia
   Slovenia
   Sweden
   Eswatini
   Sint Maarten (Dutch part)
   Seychelles
   Syrian Arab Republic
   Turks and Caicos Islands
   Chad
   Togo
   Thailand
   Tajikistan
   Tokelau
   Turkmenistan
   Timor-Leste
   Tonga
   Trinidad and Tobago
   Tunisia
   Türkiye
   Tuvalu
   Taiwan, Province of China
   Tanzania, United Republic of
   Uganda
   Ukraine
   United States Minor Outlying Islands
   Uruguay
   United States of America
   Uzbekistan
   Holy See
   Saint Vincent and the Grenadines
   Venezuela (Bolivarian Republic of)
   Virgin Islands (British)
   Virgin Islands (U.S.)
   Viet Nam
   Vanuatu
   Wallis and Futuna
   Samoa
   Yemen
   South Africa
   Zambia
   Zimbabwe

User-assigned code elements
User-assigned code elements are codes at the disposal of users who need to add further names of countries, territories, or other geographical entities to their in-house application of ISO 3166-1, and the ISO 3166/MA will never use these codes in the updating process of the standard.

Examples 
The following codes are used in ISO/IEC 7501-1 for special machine-readable passports:

  is used for the European Union laissez-passer
  is used to represent the Sovereign Military Order of Malta
  is used for Interpol travel documents
  is used to represent a stateless person, as defined in Article 1 of the 1954 Convention Relating to the Status of Stateless Persons
  is used to represent a refugee, as defined in Article 1 of the 1951 Convention Relating to the Status of Refugees as amended by the 1967 Protocol
  is used to represent a refugee, other than as defined above
  is used to represent a person of unspecified nationality
  is used for the World Service Authority World Passport (The World Service Authority World Passport contains "WSA" as the authority code. It has been filed with the International Civil Aviation Organization, but does not appear in official ICAO documents as valid.)

NATO STANAG 1059 INT is built upon ISO alpha-3 codes, but also defines alpha-2 codes incompatible with ISO 3166-1. It introduces several private use codes for fictional countries and organizational entities:

NATO also continues to use reserved codes for continents:

Reserved code elements
Reserved code elements are codes which have become obsolete, or are required in order to enable a particular user application of the standard but do not qualify for inclusion in ISO 3166-1. To avoid transitional application problems and to aid users who require specific additional code elements for the functioning of their coding systems, the ISO 3166/MA, when justified, reserves these codes which it undertakes not to use for other than specified purposes during a limited or indeterminate period of time. The reserved alpha-3 codes can be divided into the following four categories: exceptional reservations, transitional reservations, indeterminate reservations, and codes currently agreed not to use.

Exceptional reservations
Exceptionally reserved code elements are codes reserved at the request of national ISO member bodies, governments and international organizations, which are required in order to support a particular application, as specified by the requesting body and limited to such use; any further use of such code elements is subject to approval by the ISO 3166/MA. The following alpha-3 codes are currently exceptionally reserved:

  Ascension Island Reserved on request of Universal Postal Union (UPU), also used by International Telecommunication Union (ITU)
  Clipperton Island Reserved on request of ITU
  Diego Garcia Reserved on request of ITU
  France, Metropolitan Reserved on request of France; Officially assigned before being deleted from ISO 3166-1
  USSR From June 2008; Transitionally reserved from September 1992; Officially assigned before being deleted from ISO 3166-1
  Tristan da Cunha Reserved on request of UPU

The following alpha-3 codes were previously exceptionally reserved, but are now officially assigned:

  Guernsey Reserved on request of UPU
  Isle of Man Reserved on request of UPU
  Jersey Reserved on request of UPU

Transitional reservations
Transitional reserved code elements are codes reserved after their deletion from ISO 3166-1. These codes may be used only during a transitional period of at least five years while new code elements that may have replaced them are taken into use. These codes may be reassigned by the ISO 3166/MA after the expiration of the transitional period. The following alpha-3 codes are currently transitionally reserved:

  Netherlands Antilles From December 2010
  Burma From December 1989
  Byelorussian SSR From June 1992
  Czechoslovakia From June 1993
  Neutral Zone From July 1993
  Romania From February 2002; Code changed to 
  Serbia and Montenegro From September 2006
  East Timor From May 2002
  Yugoslavia From July 2003
  Zaire From July 1997

Indeterminate reservations
Indeterminately reserved code elements are codes used to designate road vehicles under the 1949 and 1968 United Nations Conventions on Road Traffic but differing from those contained in ISO 3166-1. These code elements are expected eventually to be either eliminated or replaced by code elements within ISO 3166-1. In the meantime, the ISO 3166/MA has reserved such code elements for an indeterminate period. Any use beyond the application of the two Conventions is discouraged and will not be approved by the ISO 3166/MA. Moreover, these codes may be reassigned by the ISO 3166/MA at any time. The following alpha-3 codes are currently indeterminately reserved:

  Aden
  Barbados
  Brunei
  Canada
  Kenya
  Tanganyika [Part of Tanzania, United Republic of]
  Uganda
  Zanzibar [Part of Tanzania, United Republic of]
  Alderney
  Guernsey
  Jersey
  Isle of Man
  Gibraltar
  Guatemala
  Jordan
  Malaysia
  Central African Republic
  Congo, People's Republic of
  Chile
  Mali
  Zambia
  Korea, Republic of
  San Marino
  Southern Rhodesia [now Zimbabwe]
  Slovenia
  Suriname
  Turkmenistan
  Gambia
  Sierra Leone
  Nigeria
  Zaire, People's Republic of

The following alpha-3 code was previously indeterminately reserved, but has been reassigned to another country as its official code:

  Uruguay Code reassigned to Romania

Codes currently agreed not to use
In addition, the ISO 3166/MA will not use the following alpha-3 codes at the present stage, as they are used in ISO/IEC 7501-1 for special machine-readable passports:

  identifies a British Passport holder who is a British Overseas Territories citizen
  identifies a British Passport holder who is a British National (Overseas)
  identifies a British Passport holder who is a British Overseas citizen
  identifies a British Passport holder who is a British protected person
  identifies a British Passport holder who is a British subject
  is used as a substitute for nationality where the holder is an Official of a Specialized Agency of the UN Organization
  identifies Kosovo residents to whom travel documents were issued by the United Nations Interim Administration in Kosovo (UNMIK)
  is used to designate the UN Organization as the issuer and used as a substitute for nationality where the holder is an Official of the UN Organization

Deleted codes

  French Afars and Issas
  British Antarctic Territory
  Dronning Maud Land
  Canton and Enderbury Islands
  German Democratic Republic
  Dahomey
  Gilbert and Ellice Islands
  Upper Volta
  Johnston Island
  Midway Islands
  New Hebrides
  Pacific Islands (Trust Territory)
  Panama Canal Zone
  United States Miscellaneous Pacific Islands
  Southern Rhodesia
  Sikkim
  Viet-Nam, Democratic Republic of
  Wake Island
  Yemen, Democratic

See also
 List of IOC country codes, used by the International Olympic Committee (IOC)
 List of FIFA country codes, used by the Fédération Internationale de Football Association (FIFA)
 Comparison of alphabetic country codes

References

Sources and external links
 ISO 3166 Maintenance Agency, International Organization for Standardization (ISO)
 Reserved code elements under ISO 3166-1 "Codes for the representation of names of countries and their subdivisions – Part 1: Country codes", available on request from ISO 3166/MA
 Standard Country or Area Codes for Statistical Use, United Nations Statistics Division
 Countries or areas, codes and abbreviations list of alpha-3 and numeric codes (a few territories officially assigned codes in ISO 3166-1 are not included in this list)
 The World Factbook (public domain), Central Intelligence Agency
 Appendix D Country Data Codes comparison of FIPS 10, ISO 3166, and STANAG 1059 country codes
 Administrative Divisions of Countries ("Statoids"), Statoids.com
 Country codes comparison of ISO 3166-1 country codes with other country codes
 ISO 3166-1 Change History, Statoids.com

1 alpha-3
Country codes
Location codes